Rona, Azim's Mother is a 2018 Afghan drama film directed by Jamshid Mahmoudi. It was selected as the Afghan entry for the Best Foreign Language Film at the 91st Academy Awards, but it was not nominated.

Cast
 Mohsen Tanabandeh as Azim
 Mojtaba Pirzadeh as Faroogh
 Saeed Changizian as Hashem
 Fatemeh Hosseini as Rona
 Fereshteh Hosseini as Hengameh
 Fatemeh Mirzaei as Asemeh
 Alireza Ostadi as Fazel

See also
 List of submissions to the 91st Academy Awards for Best Foreign Language Film
 List of Afghan submissions for the Academy Award for Best Foreign Language Film

References

External links
 

2018 films
2018 drama films
Afghan drama films
2010s Persian-language films